The 2018–19 Southern Conference men's basketball season began with practices in October 2018, followed by the start of the 2018–19 NCAA Division I men's basketball season in November. Conference play will begin in January 2019 and conclude in February 2019. The season marked the 97th season of Southern Conference basketball.

Preseason

Coaching changes
On March 3, 2018, Western Carolina head coach Larry Hunter resigned after 13 seasons. On March 27, Winthrop associate head coach Mark Prosser, son of the late Skip Prosser, was named head coach of the Catamounts.

Conference predictions

Predicted results
Preseason Southern Conference Coaches Poll
1. UNCG (6)                      78
2. Wofford (4)                    74
3. ETSU                            67
4. Furman                         57
5. Mercer                          48
6. The Citadel                   38
7. Chattanooga                 30
8. Samford                        26
9. Western Carolina          20
10. VMI                             12

Preseason Southern Conference Media Poll
1. UNCG (16)                  231
2. Wofford (6)                  214
3. ETSU (2)                     198
4. Furman                       169
5. Mercer                         136
6. Chattanooga               103
7. The Citadel                  96
8. Samford                       69
9. Western Carolina         59
10. VMI                             45

Preseason Southern teams
Preseason Player of the Year
Fletcher Magee, Sr., G, Wofford

Preseason All-Southern Conference Team
Zane Najdawi, Sr., F, The Citadel
Tray Boyd III, Jr., G, ETSU
Bo Hodges, So., G/F, ETSU
Jeromy Rodriguez, R-Jr., F, ETSU
Matt Rafferty, Sr., F, Furman
Ross Cummings, Jr., G, Mercer
Francis Alonso, Sr., G, UNCG
James Dickey, Jr., F, UNCG
Bubba Parham, So., G, VMI
Cameron Jackson, Sr., F, Wofford
Fletcher Magee, Sr., G, Wofford

Watchlists

Regular season

Conference matrix

Season summary & highlights

Points scored

Conference regular season

Midseason watchlists

Postseason

Southern Tournament

Highlights

NCAA Tournament

National Invitation Tournament

Awards and honors

Conference awards and teams

National awards and teams

Players

Award finalists

References